The  Green Bay Packers season was the franchise's 96th season overall, the 94th in the National Football League, and the ninth under head coach Mike McCarthy. The team tied with four other teams for a league-best 12 wins and 4 losses, while also adding a fourth consecutive NFC North division title. The club went undefeated at home for the first time since 2011. They also led the league in scoring, with 486 points, then the second-most in franchise history (currently third most). It marked the first time since the 2009 season that the team had a 4,000-yard passer, two 1,000-yard receivers, and a 1,000-yard rusher.

In the playoffs, the Packers defeated the Dallas Cowboys in the divisional round, but then, in the NFC Championship game against the Seattle Seahawks, despite holding a 16–0 lead at halftime, and a 19–7 lead in the dwindling minutes of the fourth quarter, the Packers would collapse, and would go on to lose the game 22–28 in overtime, ending their season. Quarterback Aaron Rodgers was named the league's Most Valuable Player.

The Packers made the playoffs for the sixth straight season, tying the record set between 1993 and 1998.

Offseason

Free agents

Additions

Subtractions

Draft

Notes
The Packers were awarded two compensatory selections after losing free agents Greg Jennings and Erik Walden.
 Wide receiver Jared Abbrederis and defensive end Khyri Thornton sustained injuries prior the start of the season and were placed on injured reserve.

Undrafted free agent additions

Staff

Final roster

Preseason

Preseason roster cuts

Injured Reserve

Trades

Starters

Regular season

Offense

Defense

Postseason

Offense

Defense

Schedule

Preseason

Regular season

Note: Intra-division opponents are in bold text.

Postseason

Game summaries

Regular season

Week 1: at Seattle Seahawks

 
The Packers 2014 regular season started in the NFL Kickoff game against the defending Super Bowl XLVIII Champion Seattle Seahawks at CenturyLink Field. This marks the first competitive contest between the two teams since the Fail Mary Game. The Seahawks defense proved too strong for the Packers, as Green Bay fell to 0–1.

Week 2: vs. New York Jets

After being down 21–3 midway through the second quarter, the Packers rallied back to a five-point halftime deficit. An 80-yard TD by Jordy Nelson in the third quarter gave the Packers a lead they wouldn't relinquish. Late in the 4th quarter, the Jets had one last chance to tie the game. On 4th down, Jets quarterback Geno Smith seemed to have thrown a game-tying touchdown pass, but an official announced that the Jets had called for a timeout just before the ball was snapped. A confused Jets head coach, Rex Ryan, argued with the officials that he didn't call for a timeout. A look at the video replay showed that Jets offensive coordinator, Mary Mornhinwig, started running to Ryan, calling for a timeout. Even though the rules said that only the head coach could call for a timeout in that situation, the official simply heard a voice shouting for a timeout, and unable to look back to see who it was, since it was just before the ball was snapped, the official assumed that Ryan called for the timeout. While the Jets were able to convert the 4th down after the timeout, they were unable to move the ball any further, and turned the ball over on downs, at which point the Packers ran out the final 3:31 of the clock to get their first victory of the season.

Week 3: at Detroit Lions

For the third straight season, the Packers started off with a 1–2 record. The Lions' defense dominated the game as the Packers failed to score any points in the second, third, or fourth quarter. The Packers crossed midfield on only three drives, and they had only one such drive in the second half. The Packers' 7 points represented the lowest total that the team scored in a game that Rodgers finished. Rodgers 162 passing yards was his lowest since the 2008 season.

Week 4: at Chicago Bears

During the week prior to the Packers' crucial game against the rival 2–1 Bears, Aaron Rodgers addressed the concerns of many Packers fans, who felt that the season was already slipping away just three weeks in with a 1–2 record. In a radio interview, Rodgers said to the fans, "R-E-L-A-X. Relax." Rodgers was true to his word, completing 22 of 28 passes for 302 yards, 4 touchdown passes, 0 interceptions, and a passer rating of 151.2, making it the second game of his career where he had a passer rating of over 150. Two of his touchdown passes were to Randall Cobb as the Packers took advantage of two Jay Cutler interceptions, scoring 17 unanswered points in the second half in a 38–17 win, which was also the Packers' 700th regular season win in the NFL. This was only the second game in NFL history to not have a punt.

Week 5: vs. Minnesota Vikings

Continuing the momentum carried over from the victory over the Bears, the Packers trounced their other division rival, the Vikings, 42–10. Eddie Lacy ran for over 100 yards for the first time in the season, with 2 rushing touchdowns, while Julius Peppers reached a career milestone of accumulating over 100 career sacks as well as 10 career interceptions. The win improved the Packers to 3–2, the first time the team was over .500 for the season.

Week 6: at Miami Dolphins

The Packers had a solid showing in the first half against the Dolphins, spotting an early 10–3 lead, but the Dolphins were able to rally back and had a 24–17 lead late in the 4th quarter. After a Mason Crosby field goal, the Packers forced Miami to punt, and a 17-yard return by Micah Hyde got the Packers the ball at their own 40 yard line with just over 2 minutes left, but no timeouts remaining. Aaron Rodgers led the Packers rally, first converting a 4th and 10, and later a 3rd and 10. With less than 30 seconds left in the game, with the clock running, Rodgers discreetly called for a "fake spike" play, which he successfully executed with a pass to Davante Adams, who went out of bounds at the Dolphins 4 yard line with 6 seconds left. Rodgers then threw the game-winning touchdown pass to Andrew Quarless, giving the Packers a 27–24 victory.

Week 7: vs. Carolina Panthers

The Packers roared out of the gate against Carolina, scoring the first 28 points of the game, and stayed in control for the rest of the game, only giving up two touchdowns to the Panthers late, with the game already out of reach. The Packers improved to 5–2 for the season, and were now 4–0 since Aaron Rodgers told Packers fans to "relax."

Week 8: at New Orleans Saints

With the game tied at 16–16, Aaron Rodgers suffered a hamstring injury in the third quarter, which hampered his playing for the rest of the game. The Saints dominated the rest of the way, outscoring the Packers 28–7 in the second half.

This would be only the third game in NFL history to not have a single punt.

Week 9: Bye week
No game. Green Bay had a bye week.

Week 10: vs. Chicago Bears

After a week off to let his hurt hamstring to heal, Aaron Rodgers and the rest of the Packers made a dominant showing over the rival Bears, building an insurmountable 42–0 lead in the first half. After forcing a Bears' punt, Rodgers marched the Packers 71 yards in 12 plays to take a 7–0 lead on a touchdown pass to Brandon Bostick on fourth-and-goal. The Bears' following possession lasted only two plays as Micah Hyde intercepted Jay Cutler and returned the ball 9 yards to the Bears 23-yard line. Four plays later Rodgers connected with Andrew Quarless for a 4-yard touchdown. After another punt by the Bears, the Packers went 72 yards in three plays. After the first two plays went for −1 yard, Rodgers hit Jordy Nelson for a 73-yard touchdown pass on the first play of the second quarter. After a three-and-out by the Bears offense, Rodgers once again hit Nelson for a 40-yard touchdown pass on the fourth play of the Packers responding drive. The Bears started to move the ball on their next drive as they drove 70 yards, but turned the ball over on downs at the Packers 4-yard line. The Packers responded by driving 95 yards with Rodgers hitting Eddie Lacy for a 56-yard touchdown on a screen pass, extending the lead to 35–0. The Bears turned the ball over on downs again on their next drive. After both teams lost fumbles, Rodgers hit Randall Cobb, making the score a 42–0 run-over. On their second possession of the second half, Mason Crosby extended the Packers' lead to 45–0. The Bears finally got the scoreboard on their next drive as Cutler connected with Brandon Marshall for a 45-yard touchdown pass to cap of a 75-yard drive. Crosby connected on a 20-yard field goal next and after a three-and-out each, Casey Hayward intercepted Cutler and returned it 82 yards for a touchdown, extending the score to 55-7 early in the fourth quarter. Chris Williams returned the ensuing kickoff 101 yards for a touchdown, making the final score 55–14. Rodgers threw six first-half touchdowns, which matched the Packers' single-game record (with Matt Flynn) and the NFL record for touchdowns in a half (with Daryle Lamonica, 1969). The final score of 55 points tied a Lambeau Field record and Rodgers threw his NFL-record 16th scoring pass of 70 yards or more.

The Bears also became the first NFL team in over 90 years to give up over 50 points in consecutive games.

Week 11: vs. Philadelphia Eagles

The Packers' utter dominance continued with another overwhelming performance over another NFC power, the Eagles. Aaron Rodgers broke Tom Brady's mark of 288 passes at home without being intercepted. The Green Bay quarterback set several other records for passing at home, including an NFL-record 29 straight touchdown passes without an interception.

The Packers scored touchdowns on all three parts of the team, offense, defense, and special teams. Julius Peppers returned an interception for a touchdown, his second of the year, and Micah Hyde returned a punt for a touchdown.

The Packers got going from the very beginning. They drove 75 yards on their opening drive, but had to settle for a 27-yard field goal by Crosby. After an Eagles' punt, the Packers marched on a 13 play, 88-yard drive culminating in a 4-yard touchdown pass to Davante Adams. On the drive, the Packers converted three 3rd-and-longs and took 6:47 off the clock. The Eagles punted again, but this time Micah Hyde returned the punt 75 yards for a touchdown, giving the Packers a shocking 17–0 lead. The Eagles responded on their next possession with a 33-yard field goal by Cody Parkey early in the second quarter. The Eagles, though, had no answer for the Packers' passing game. Rodgers marched the Packers 80 yards in merely 6 plays to increase the lead to 24–3 on a 27-yard touchdown pass to Jordy Nelson. After a punt, the Packers struck again. 80 yards on another time-consuming drive ending with Eddie Lacy driving in a 1-yard touchdown run, but a failed two-point conversion. The Eagles reached the Packers' 15, but settled for another 33-yard field goal as the half expired. Mark Sanchez was stripped early in the 3rd quarter with Nick Perry recovering. The Eagles defense finally made a stand and forced a punt, but the Eagles were forced to punt on their responding drive. The Eagles' defense couldn't hold this time and Crosby kicked a 33-yard field goal increasing the lead to 33–6. The Eagles buried themselves on the next drive as Sanchez threw a 52-yard pick-six to Julius Peppers (with a blocked PAT), making the score 39–6. The Eagles immediately answered, driving 80 yards (with a 4th down conversion) with Sanchez throwing a 10-yard touchdown pass to Jordan Matthews. However, the Packers struck right back with an 80yard scoring drive capped off with Rodgers throwing a screen pass to Lacy who took it 32 yards for a touchdown, pushing the lead to 46–13. However, Eagles mishaps continued as Sanchez threw an interception to Tramon Williams, but Crosby missed a field goal. Then on the following drive after reaching the Packers 40, Sanchez fumbled and Hayward returned the fumble 49 yards for a touchdown, making the score a mind boggling 53–13. The Eagles were able to March 80 yards and score on a 20-yard touchdown reception by Jeremy Maclin on their next drive closing the scoring.

The Packers achieved a new franchise mark, as this was the first time ever since the franchise started playing in the NFL that they scored over 50 points in consecutive games (the Packers had scored over 50 points in 6 consecutive games as a "town team" in 1919, their first season of existence.). Green Bay improved to a record of 7–3.

Week 12: at Minnesota Vikings

Coming off two consecutive 50+ points wins, the Packers were able to improve to an 8–3 record and captured the first place in their division.

With the Vikings playing their home games at TCF Bank Stadium while their new stadium was being built, this marked the first outdoor Packers at Vikings game since 1981.

Week 13: vs. New England Patriots

The Packers improved to a 9–3 record by defeating the New England Patriots 26–21, despite going 0 for 4 in the red zone. It was the first matchup between Aaron Rodgers and Tom Brady, as Rodgers missed the 2010 matchup at Gillette Stadium with a concussion. Aaron Rodgers continued a streak of passes at home without an interception: 360 passes including 31 touchdown passes. The Patriots were only behind 16–14 with a minute left in the first half, but a 45-yard touchdown pass to Jordy Nelson gave Green Bay a 9-point halftime lead. A scoreless third quarter, and no red-zone touchdowns for the entire game for the Packers, gave New England a chance for victory. The Patriots scored again to make it only a two-point deficit, but another Green Bay field goal and stout fourth-quarter defense gave the Packers victory over a strong Patriots squad.

Week 14: vs. Atlanta Falcons

Once again Aaron Rodgers had a big day shredding the Falcons' last-ranked defense, but the Falcons fought back.

The Packers received the opening kickoff and stormed 81 yards needing only 7 plays with James Starks running in a 3-yard touchdown. The drive was so efficient they didn't even face a third down. As a sign of things to come, the Falcons struck right back with a 4-yard Steven Jackson touchdown run to end a 72-yard drive. The Packers, as they did often, answered the Falcons with another touchdown of their own. Showing off their ability to kill the clock with long drives, the Packers used 13 plays and over 7 minutes to go 80 yards with Lacy running in his second touchdown of the game on the first play of the second quarter. After a Falcons three-and-out the Packers again worked the clock, driving 80 yards in just under six minutes, but the Falcons defense made a rare stand and Crosby kicked a field goal. Morgan Burnett intercepted Matt Ryan on their next possession and returned it 32 yards to the Falcons 15. Four plays later Rodgers threw a 1-yard touchdown pass to Lacy. The Falcons offense continued to sputter as they punted. The Packers stayed hot with Rodgers hitting Nelson for a 10-yard touchdown with twenty-four seconds left in the half. The Falcons managed to reach field goal range with the big play being a Ryan 30-yard bomb to Julio Jones. However, Brad Jones blocked Matt Bryant's 53-yard field goal attempt, leaving the score 31–7 at halftime. The Falcons busted out in the third quarter. On the first play from scrimmage Ryan launched a pass to Jones for 79 yards the Packers 3-yard line. However, they lost two yards on their next three plays, but on fourth-and-goal from the 5-yard line Ryan threw a 5-yard touchdown pass to Eric Weems, trimming the score to 31–14. After a Packers punt the Falcons reached the Packers 31, but were forced to settle for a 50-yard field goal. The Packers added a field goal on their next drive, the Falcons mimicked the Packers clock-killing strategy (possibly, ultimately to their detriment) taking six-and-a-half minutes off the clock as they traveled 72 yards with Ryan dropping a 22-yard touchdown pass into the hands of Jones who had the best game of his career. However, Rodgers and the Packers offense regrouped and stormed 74 yards in four plays with Rodgers hitting his number one guy Nelson for a 60-yard touchdown pass. The Falcons' Rashede Hageman blocked Crosby's PAT keeping the deficit two scores at 40–24. The shootout continued as the Falcons answered right back with Ryan lobbing a 1-yard touchdown pass to Roddy White, but the two-point conversion failed which would prove critical as the score remained 40–30. The Falcons onside kick attempt failed, but they didn't allow a first down, keeping them in the game as Crosby nailed a 53-yard field goal, increasing the lead to 43–30. Ryan continued to shred the Packers' defense, darting a 2-yard touchdown pass to Harry Douglas, making the score 43–37 and giving the Falcons a chance to pull off the improbable comeback. However, a 41-yard run by James Starks enabled the Packers to run out the clock and hold on for the win.

Week 15: at Buffalo Bills

Both teams' defenses dictated the game throughout by not allowing a TD-pass and only two TDs overall. Aaron Rodgers threw two interceptions after only three the whole season. The Packers' receivers had a bad day as well, dropping 8 passes, the most drops by an NFL team in a game since 2008. The Packers fell to 10–4 with the loss, and 1–5 in Buffalo as a franchise.

Week 16: at Tampa Bay Buccaneers

The Packers gave a strong defensive show in a win over the lowly Buccaneers, holding Tampa Bay to 109 yards of net offense, and only 16 yards rushing. The Packers' offense scuffled some, as Aaron Rodgers nursed a sore calf. Running back Eddie Lacy broke the 1,000-yard mark for the season, making him the first Packer since John Brockington to rush for over 1,000 yards in each of his first two seasons. The 20–3 win gave Green Bay a 11–4 record and secured the Packers a spot in the playoffs.

Week 17: vs. Detroit Lions

The Packers and Lions, both 11–4 and playoff-bound, faced off with the NFC North division title on the line, as well as a first-round bye in the playoffs. The Packers got the early lead on a Micah Hyde punt return for a touchdown, but then suffered a potentially crippling loss when Aaron Rodgers reinjured his calf while throwing a touchdown pass to Randall Cobb. Rodgers had to be helped off the field and was then carted to the locker room. The game's momentum swung to the Lions as they came back to tie the game in the third quarter. Aaron Rodgers then returned to the game, gutting through the calf injury to give the Packers the lead back with first another touchdown pass to Cobb and then scoring a touchdown of his own on a quarterback sneak. The 30–20 win gave the Packers a final 12-4 record, the number 2 seed in the playoffs, and their 4th straight NFC North division title.

Postseason

NFC Wild card Playoffs
Clinching the division and the #2 overall seed in the NFC, the Packers had a first round bye.

NFC Divisional Playoffs: vs. #3 Dallas Cowboys

NFC Championship: vs. #1 Seattle Seahawks

Green Bay lost this game despite having a 16–0 halftime lead and a 19–7 lead plus possession of the football with 5 minutes remaining in the 4th quarter. The Packers forced 5 turnovers, with 4 of them being Wilson interceptions.  However, the Packers only scored 6 points off of those 5 turnovers and had only one touchdown, allowing the Seahawks to remain within striking distance.  With over 5 minutes remaining in the 4th quarter, Wilson was intercepted for the 4th time by safety Morgan Burnett, who then slid down as if the game was just won.  The Packers executed an ultra-conservative tactic by running the ball three times in a row, for negative 2 yards, negative 2 yards, and two yards, wasting only 10 seconds of clock due to Seattle timeouts. The Packers punted and the Seahawks scored their first offensive touchdown on their next drive to cut the deficit to 5.  With 2:09 remaining and the Packers leading 19–14, the Seahawks were able to recover an onside kick that was fumbled by Packer TE Brandon Bostick.  They scored a touchdown on the following drive to go up 20–19.  A hail mary attempt on a two-point conversion made it 22-19 Seahawks with 1:25 remaining in regulation.  The Packers forced overtime with a Mason Crosby field goal, but the Seahawks won the coin toss and elected to receive the ball.  The Seahawks scored a touchdown on their first drive in overtime, ending the game and the Packers' season. Additionally, the season ended the same way it began, by losing to the Seahawks at CenturyLink Field in the Kickoff Game.

Standings

Division

Conference

Statistics

Regular season statistical leaders

Best game performances

Awards

References

External links

Green Bay
Green Bay Packers seasons
NFC North championship seasons
Green